Aeryn Michael John Gillern disappeared in Vienna on the evening of Monday, October 29, 2007. At the time, Gillern was working for UNIDO.

Biography 
Aeryn Gillern was born on April 28, 1973 in Elmira, New York, the son of Kathryn Gilleran (born 1952). In June 1991 he graduated from Groton High School in Groton, New York. In 1997 Gillern graduated the Franciscan University of Steubenville (Ohio) with a Bachelor of Arts degree in theology. From 1997 to 1998, Gillern attended the seminary at Graz-Seckau (Austria). In 1999, Gillern received a Master of Arts with honors in Theology and Christian Ministry from Franciscan University of Steubenville. In 2003 he was appointed by United Nations Industrial Development Organization (UNIDO) in Vienna (Austria) as a research assistant. In 2006, he was named Mr. Gay Austria.

In September 2007, he flew home to his mother, Kathryn Gilleran, in Cortland, New York, to visit his family for ten days. His mother was planning to sell their house and move to Vienna to be with her son. On October 27, 2007 Kathy phoned her son and talked to him for the last time. He disappeared two days later.

Disappearance
His mother received a call on Halloween 2007 that Aeryn was missing. 
It was believed by Austrian police that he was last seen running naked from the Kaiserbründl sauna in Weihburggasse after an assumed physical altercation where one person allegedly went to the hospital although his last confirmed location was a sauna on Stephansplatz after work. Police have asserted that he may have been suicidal and jumped to his death in the Danube, a hypothesis Gillern's acquaintances do not believe; others, including his mother, argue that the investigation into his disappearance was hampered by police bias against Gillern's sexuality. The Austrian police changed their statement a multitude of times, as well as denying the presence of any witnesses, despite a phone call they had received from a couple only a day after Gillern was declared missing. The Austrian police initially refused to investigate the case, saying it was not its duty to investigate the disappearance of non-citizens, and refused to interview her or any of her son's friends after the investigation was finally launched under pressure from the United Nations and the Austrian Foreign Ministry.

Aftermath
Each year since 2008, Gillern's mother has held a vigil every October 29 outside the Kaiserbründl to commemorate the disappearance of her son. The 2011 documentary Gone: The Disappearance of Aeryn Gillern, which debuted at that year's Tribeca Film Festival, is dedicated to his mother's search for the truth behind her son's disappearance.

See also
List of people who disappeared

References

External links 
 Abgängig mitten im ersten Bezirk
 Homepage Aeryn Gillern
 New documentation: Aeryn Gillern – July 6, 2012 ORF – Peter Resetarits
 Parlamentarische Anfrage by Ulrike Lunacek
 Homepage about the movie Gone
 Murder or Suicide – The movie Gone
 What Happened to Aeryn Gillern?
 Homepage Joseph Gepp

2000s missing person cases
2000s in Vienna
2007 crimes in Austria
2007 in LGBT history
Crime in Vienna
LGBT history in Austria
American LGBT people
Missing person cases in Austria
October 2007 events in Europe
People from Elmira, New York